The 1925 Dayton Triangles season was their sixth in the league. The team failed to improve on their previous output of 2–6, losing seven games. They tied for sixteenth place in the league.

Schedule

 Game in italics is against a non-NFL team.

Standings

References

Dayton Triangles seasons
Dayton Triangles
Toronto, Ohio
Steubenville, Ohio
Dayton Tri
National Football League winless seasons